2 Timothy 1 is the first chapter of the Second Epistle to Timothy in the New Testament of the Christian Bible. The letter is traditionally attributed to Paul the Apostle, the last one written in Rome before his death (c. 64 or 67), addressed to Timothy. There are charges that it is the work of an anonymous follower, after Paul's death in the first century AD. This chapter contains an opening greeting, a personal story of Paul and Timothy, a description of the opponents they are facing.

Text
The original text was written in Koine Greek. This chapter is divided into 18 verses.

Textual witnesses
Some early manuscripts containing the text of this chapter are:
Codex Sinaiticus (AD 330–360)
Codex Alexandrinus (400–440)
Codex Ephraemi Rescriptus (c. 450; extant verses 3–18)
Codex Freerianus (c. 450; extant verses 1–3, 10–12)
Codex Claromontanus (c. 550)

Opening Greeting and Warnings (1:1–2)
The format of the opening greeting is familiar and follows the few first-century letter-writing conventions, comprising the name of the sender(s) and the recipient(s) with a salutation, similar to the one in the earlier epistle to Timothy.

Verse 1
Paul, an apostle of Christ Jesus by the will of God, in keeping with the promise of life that is in Christ Jesus,
"Paul, an apostle of Christ Jesus": refers to the converted Pharisee and apostle to the Gentiles; the same person who authored all the undisputed Pauline letters. The term "apostle" invokes the concept of his calling to ministry and appeals to authority.

Verse 2
To Timothy, my dear son:
 Grace, mercy and peace from God the Father and Christ Jesus our Lord.
"Timothy": a Paul's convert, originally of Lystra (Acts 16:1) with a Jewess mother, Eunice, an unnamed Greek father and a grandmother named Lois (2 Timothy 1:5).
"My dear son" (NKJV; KJV: "my dearly beloved son"; Greek: ἀγαπητῷ τέκνῳ, agapētō teknō): In 1 Timothy 1:2, and Titus 1:4, written at an earlier period than this Epistle, the expression used is in the Greek, "my genuine son" (Greek: γνησίῳ τέκνῳ, gnēsiō teknō). Alford sees in the change of expression an intimation of an altered tone to Timothy, more of affection, and less of confidence, to indicate that Paul saw a lack of firmness in him, so he needs to stir up afresh the faith and grace in Christ (2 Timothy 1:6), but this seems not justified by the Greek word "agapetos", which implies the attachment of reasoning in the one "beloved," not of solely instinctive love.

Thanksgiving for Timothy's Faith (1:3–5)
The portion of thanksgiving-prayer is typical of the Hellenistic or Hellenistic-Jewish letters and included in most of Pauline letters, but the tone in this epistle is more for encouragement and forms a basis of Paul's appeal to Timothy.

Verse 5
When I call to remembrance the unfeigned faith that is in thee, which dwelt first in thy grandmother Lois, and thy mother Eunice; and I am persuaded that in thee also.
 "Eunice" was a Jewish woman who "believed" in Christ, married to a Greek man and have a son, Timothy (Acts 16:1).
"The unfeigned faith": how Paul describes the faith and heritage of Timothy, which Paul is thankful for. Philip Towner summarized Paul's intention in this part is to confirm with Timothy that "in terms of our faith and spiritual heritage, we are cut from the same cloth. The obligations and call to duty that this implies for me also implies for you."

The Renewed Call to Boldness and Faithfulness in Ministry (1:6–14)
Based on Paul's confidence in Timothy's faith as expressed in the previous section, Paul gives his instructions to Timothy, more like handing over his ministry to his successor.

Verse 6Therefore I remind you to stir up the gift of God which is in you through the laying on of my hands.Verse 7For God has not given us a spirit of fear, but of power and of love and of a sound mind."A spirit": may refer to the human personality under the Spirit’s influence (cf. 1 Corinthians 4:21; Galatians 6:1; 1 Peter 3:4) or the "Holy Spirit" (cf. 2 Timothy 1:14).

Verse 9He has saved us and called us to a holy life—not because of anything we have done but because of his own purpose and grace. This grace was given us in Christ Jesus before the beginning of time,Philip Towner sees this and the next verse present "a carefully constructed unit of theology that emphasizes a traditional understanding of salvation."

Verse 10but it has now been revealed through the appearing of our Savior, Christ Jesus, who has destroyed death and has brought life and immortality to light through the gospel. "Now been revealed" (NKJV; KJV: "made manifest"): concerning the grace of God's salvation, which was hidden in God's heart in the promises of the Old Testament, then to be clearly and abundantly manifested through the appearance of Jesus Christ.
 "Has destroyed (NKJV; KJV: "abolished") death": that is, the taking away the sting and curse of the law of sin, which lead to the second death.
 "Has brought life and immortality to light through the gospel": proclaiming Christ as the first man who rose again from the dead to an immortal life; the first to be shown the path of life. The doctrine of the resurrection of the dead was already known in the Old Testament, but not as clearly revealed as in the Gospel by the resurrection of Christ.

Verse 13Hold fast the pattern of sound words which you have heard from me, in faith and love which are in Christ Jesus."Sound": here is in the sense of "healthy".

Models of Shame and Courage (1:15–18)
Paul names Phygellus and Hermogenes who have turned away from him in Asia, in contrast to Onesiphorus, who remains faithful. The first two characters illustrate for Timothy 'the shameful way of willful dissociation' from Paul and his ministry.

Verses 16–18The Lord grant mercy to the household of Onesiphorus, for he often refreshed me, and was not ashamed of my chain; but when he arrived in Rome, he sought me out very zealously and found me. The Lord grant to him that he may find mercy from the Lord in that Day—and you know very well how many ways he ministered to me at Ephesus.''
Paul greets "the household of Onesiphorus" (as Paul did again in 2 Timothy 4:19, without referring to the man himself) and mentions the loyal services he had done; after that Paul wishes him well (verse 18a). Roman Catholics consider these verses as an implication that Onesiphorus was already dead, as "the easiest and most natural hypothesis".

See also
 Asia
 Ephesus
 Eunice
 Jesus Christ
 Lois
 Onesiphorus
 Paul of Tarsus
 Phygellus
 Rome
 Timothy
Related Bible parts: John 14, Acts 16, 1 Timothy 1

References

Sources

External links
 King James Bible - Wikisource
English Translation with Parallel Latin Vulgate
Online Bible at GospelHall.org (ESV, KJV, Darby, American Standard Version, Bible in Basic English)
Multiple bible versions at Bible Gateway (NKJV, NIV, NRSV etc.)

01